The Brunei History Centre (abbreviated as ) is a government institution which conducts research, documentation, publication and dissemination on matters pertaining to the history of Brunei. It was established in 1982 by the consent of Sultan Hassanal Bolkiah as an institute of historical research on Brunei for the benefit of the Bruneian people. The head of Brunei History Centre is a Principal, which is held by Mohd. Jamil Al-Sufri. It is a government department under the Ministry of Culture, Youth and Sports.

History 
The Brunei History Centre was established on 26 January 1982 by the Consent of His Majesty Sultan Hassanal Bolkiah to conduct research and dissemination on the history of Brunei for the benefit of the people in the country. Initially, the Centre was housed in the main branch of the Dewan Bahasa dan Pustaka Library at Jalan Elizabeth II, Bandar Seri Begawan. In 1985, it was moved to the building at Jalan Stoney which was formerly the then Department of Education. In 1988, the Centre finally moved to the present building at Jalan James Pearce.

References 

History Centre
1982 establishments in Brunei

History Centre
Historical research institutes
Research institutes established in 1982